Events from the year 1809 in Spain.

Incumbents
Monarch: Joseph I

Events
January 1 - Battle of Castellón
January 3 - Battle of Cacabelos
January 13 - Battle of Uclés (1809)
January 16 - Battle of Corunna
February 25 - Battle of Valls
March 17 - Battle of Villafranca (1809)
March 24 - Battle of Los Yébenes
March 27 - Battle of Ciudad Real
March 28 - Battle of Medellín
May 6-December 12 - Third Siege of Gerona
May 14 - Battle of Alcantara (1809)
May 23 - Battle of Alcañiz
June 7–9 - Battle of Puente Sanpayo
June 15 - Battle of María
June 18 - Battle of Belchite (1809)
July 27–28 - Battle of Talavera
August 8 - Battle of Arzobispo
August 11 - Battle of Almonacid
August 12 - Battle of Puerto de Baños
October 18 - Battle of Tamames
November 19 - Battle of Ocaña
November 23 - Battle of Carpio
November 26 - Battle of Alba de Tormes

Births
January 12 - Leopoldo O'Donnell, 1st Duke of Tetuan (d. 1867)

Deaths
January 7 - Benito de San Juan
January 18 - Francisco Taranco y Llano
February 24 - Juan O'Neylle
April 23 - Theodor von Reding
April 24 - Juan Miguel de Vives y Feliu

See also
Peninsular War

References

 
Years of the 19th century in Spain